The Morris K. Udall and Stewart L. Udall Foundation is an Executive Branch office of the United States Government. The Foundation was established by the Congress in 1992 to honor Morris Udall's thirty years of service in the House of Representatives. Congress amended the name in 2009 to include Stewart Udall, in recognition of his public service. The full official name of the Foundation is Morris K. Udall and Stewart L. Udall Scholarship and Excellence in National Environmental Policy Foundation. The President of the United States appoints its board of trustees with the advice and consent of the Senate.

Foundation programs
The purpose and motto of the Foundation is "Scholarship and Excellence in national environmental policy." To support this purpose the Foundation's programs are:

Annual scholarships and fellowships to outstanding students who intend to pursue careers related to the natural environment. A student who receives such a scholarship may be known as Udall Scholar.
Annual scholarships and internships to outstanding Native American and Alaska Native college students who intend to pursue careers in health care and tribal public policy.
Parks in Focus, which takes young people into national and state parks to expose them to the grandeur of the nation's natural resources and instill a sustainable appreciation for the environment.
Host an annual conference or discussion of contemporary environmental or Native American issues.
A program for environmental policy research and a program for environmental conflict resolution at the Udall Center for Studies in Public Policy at the University of Arizona.
The U.S. Institute for Environmental Conflict Resolution, which provides mediation and other services to assist in resolving federal environmental conflicts.
The Native Nations Institute for Leadership, Management, and Policy (NNI), which focuses on leadership education for tribal leaders and on policy research. The Morris K. Udall Foundation and the University of Arizona founded NNI, which is an outgrowth of the research programs of the Harvard Project on American Indian Economic Development.

The Udall Scholarship
The Foundation awards 50 scholarships of $7,000 and 50 honorable mentions annually on the basis of merit to sophomore and junior-level college students who:

Have demonstrated commitment to careers related to the environment; or
Have demonstrated commitment to careers related to tribal public policy or health care, and are Native American or Alaska Native

To apply for the Udall Scholarship, undergraduate students must:

Be nominated by their university (each university may nominate up to six applicants)
Submit an online application, which consists of 11 short-essay questions and one 800-word essay
Submit transcripts for all college coursework taken within the past 10 years, excluding courses taken prior to high school graduation
Submit three letters of recommendation

In addition to the financial award, scholars also attend a four-day Udall Scholars Orientation in Tucson, Arizona to meet with other Scholars, elected officials, environmental and tribal leaders. Travel from the Scholar's home or school, lodging, and meals are provided by the Foundation. Scholars also benefit from access to a network of environmental, Native American health and tribal policy professionals through the Udall Alumni Association listserv. The Udall Scholarship is a highly competitive award and is regarded by most universities as one of several prestigious scholarships (alongside the Churchill Scholarship, the Fulbright Scholarship, the Gates Cambridge Scholarship, the Harry S. Truman Scholarship, the Marshall Scholarship, the Mitchell Scholarship, and the Rhodes Scholarship).

Native American congressional internships
According to the Foundation, the Native American Congressional Internship Program provides Native Americans and Alaska Natives with an insider's view of the federal government. The ten-week internship in Washington, D.C., places students in Senate and House offices, committees, Cabinet departments and the White House, where they are able to observe government decision-making processes first-hand.

In 2006, the Foundation expected to award 12 internships on the basis of merit to Native Americans and Alaska Natives who:
Are college juniors or seniors, recent graduates from tribal or four-year colleges, or graduate or law students;
Have demonstrated an interest in fields related to tribal public policy, such as tribal governance, tribal law, Native American education, Native American health, Native American justice, natural resource protection, and Native American economic development.

Funding
The Foundation's activities are supported by two distinct funds in the U.S. Treasury. Educational activities are supported primarily by interest generated by a trust fund established by Congress; the Foundation may also accept private donations for educational activities. The activities of the U.S. Institute for Environmental Conflict Resolution, which provides assessment, mediation, facilitation and related services to assist in resolving federal environmental conflicts, are supported by annual appropriations and fees charged for services.

Management
, the Foundation's top management is:
David Brown, Executive Director

Board of Trustees
Eric D. Eberhard, Chair
Anne J. Udall, Vice Chair
Camilla C. Feibelman
James L. Huffman II
Tadd M. Johnson
Lisa Johnson Billy
Mark T. Nethery
Mary B. Neumayr
D. Michael Rappoport
Robert C. Robbins
Charles P. Rose

See also 
 Churchill Scholarship
 Fulbright Scholarship
 Gates Cambridge Scholarship
 Harry S. Truman Scholarship
 Marshall Scholarship
 Mitchell Scholarship
 Rhodes Scholarship
 Schwarzman Scholarship at Tsinghua University
 Yenching Scholarship at Peking University

References

External links

The Morris K Udall and Stewart L. Udall Foundation
University of Arizona Udall Center for Studies in Public Policy

Conservation and environmental foundations in the United States
Educational foundations in the United States
Independent agencies of the United States government
Organizations established in 1992
Scholarships in the United States